António Gomes Leal was a Portuguese poet.

Life and work
Leal was born in Rossio, part of Lisbon. He was the son of João António Gomes Leal (d. 1876), a customs officer, and Henrietta Fernandina Monteiro Alves Cabral Leal.

Leal studied literature, but did not complete his studies and became a notary clerk of Lisbon.  During his youth he took the pose of a poet interested in Bohemianism and Satanism, but with the death of his mother in 1910, he fell into poverty and converted to Catholicism.

References

External links
 

19th-century Portuguese poets
19th-century male writers
Portuguese male poets
1848 births
People from Lisbon
1921 deaths